This is a summary of 1954 in music of all genres in the United Kingdom.

Events
14 January – The Boy Friend,  opens in the West End, with understudy Anne Rogers in the lead role after Diana Maddox falls ill at the dress rehearsal.
5 August – Salad Days opens in the West End after a short run in Bristol. It becomes the longest-running musical in British theatre history until overtaken by Oliver! in 1960.
14 September – Benjamin Britten conducts the premiere of his opera The Turn of the Screw at Teatro La Fenice, Venice.
18 September – The Last Night of the Proms for the first time features the almost invariable coupling of Sir Henry Wood's 1905 Fantasia on British Sea Songs, Sir Edward Elgar's 1902 setting of "Land of Hope and Glory", Sir Hubert Parry's 1916 setting of William Blake's "Jerusalem", and "Rule, Britannia!".
1 October – The UK Singles Chart is expanded into a Top 20.
3 December – William Walton's opera Troilus and Cressida opens at the Royal Opera House, Covent Garden. It is not a success.

Charts
See UK No.1 Hits of 1954

Classical music: new works
Gerald Finzi – Cello Concerto in A minor
Alun Hoddinott – Clarinet Concerto
Daniel Jones – Symphony No. 4
Ralph Vaughan Williams – Tuba Concerto in F minor

Opera
Benjamin Britten – The Turn of the Screw
Arwel Hughes – Menna
John Joubert - Antigone (for radio)
William Walton – Troilus and Cressida

Film and Incidental music
Malcolm Arnold
The Belles of St Trinian's, starring Alistair Sim.
Hobson's Choice directed by David Lean, starring Charles Laughton, Brenda De Banzie, John Mills and Prunella Scales.
The Sea Shall Not Have Them, starring Michael Redgrave, Dirk Bogarde and Anthony Steel.
Francis Chagrin – An Inspector Calls directed by Guy Hamilton, starring Alastair Sim.
Eric Coates – The Dam Busters March
Mátyás Seiber – Animal Farm

Musical theatre
Salad Days, with music by Julian Slade and lyrics by Dorothy Reynolds and Julian Slade
Zuleika, with music by Peter Tranchell and lyrics by James Ferman

Musical films
Lilacs in the Spring, starring Anna Neagle

Births
23 January – Edward Ka-Spel, singer-songwriter 
8 March – Cheryl Baker, singer with Bucks Fizz
15 March – Isobel Buchanan, operatic soprano
8 May 
John Michael Talbot,  American singer-songwriter and guitarist (Mason Proffit) 
Gary Wilmot, entertainer
11 May – Judith Weir, composer
10 July – Neil Tennant, singer-songwriter and record producer (Pet Shop Boys)
11 August – Joe Jackson, singer, songwriter and composer
25 August – Elvis Costello, singer-songwriter
3 November – Adam Ant, singer
4 November – Chris Difford, singer, songwriter and record producer (Squeeze)
18 November – John Parr, singer
7 December – Mike Nolan, singer with Bucks Fizz
10 December – Jack Hues, singer-songwriter and guitarist (Wang Chung)
25 December – Annie Lennox, singer

Deaths
18 January – Herbert Heyner, operatic baritone, 71
3 March – Noel Gay, songwriter, 55
4 April – Frederick Lonsdale, dramatist of musicals, 73
24 July – Anne Gilchrist, folk song collector, 90
9 August – Frederick Keel, baritone singer and composer, 83
14 December – Philip Ritte, operatic tenor, 83
29 November – Sir George Robey, music hall star, 85
date unknown –  George Alex Stevens, songwriter and musical show director

See also 
 1954 in British television
 1954 in the United Kingdom
 List of British films of 1954

References 

 
British Music, 1954 In
British music by year